Joel (– Yōʾēl;  – Iōḗl;  – Yu'il) was an Israelite prophet, the second of the twelve minor prophets and according to the book itself the author of the Book of Joel. He is mentioned by name only once in the Hebrew Bible, in the introduction to that book, as the son of Pethuel (Joel 1:1). The name Joel combines the covenant name of God, YHWH (or Yahweh), and El (god), and has been translated as "YHWH is God" or "one to whom YHWH is God," that is, a worshiper of YHWH.

Life
Some commentators suggest that Joel lived in the 9th century BCE, whereas others assign him to the 5th or 4th century BCE. The dating of his book is similarly debated; there are no mentions of kings that might help locate it in time. The book's mention of Greeks has not given scholars any help in dating the text since the Greeks were known to have had access to Judah from Mycenaean times (c. 1600–1100 BC). However, the book's mention of Judah's suffering  and to the standing temple have led some scholars to place the date of the book in the post-exilic period, after the construction of the Second Temple. Joel was originally from Judah/Judea, and, judging from its prominence in his prophecy, was quite possibly a prophet associated with the ritual of either Solomon's or the Second temple, depending on the date when he lived.  

According to a long-standing tradition, Joel was buried in Gush Halav.

In Christianity
On the Eastern Orthodox liturgical calendar, his feast day is October 19.

In the Roman Martyrology, the prophet is commemorated on July 13.

He is commemorated with the other minor prophets in the Calendar of saints of the Armenian Apostolic Church on July 31.

Joel's statement that "I will pour out my spirit upon all flesh; and your sons and your daughters shall prophesy, your old men shall dream dreams, your young men shall see visions" was applied by St Peter in his sermon at Pentecost to the events of that day. Since then, other religious figures have interpreted the words as having special significance for their own time.

According to the Eastern Orthodox Christian hymns, the ancient hymnographer Anatolius links Joel's prophecy to the birth of Christ. In Joel 2:30, he says that the blood refers to the incarnation of Jesus Christ, the fire to the Divinity of Christ, and the pillars of smoke to the Holy Spirit.

In the Baha'i Faith
Joel is considered a minor prophet in the Baha'i Faith. In the Kitab-i-Iqan, Baha'ullah states that previous prophecies by minor prophets such as Joel have symbolic meanings and significance and therefore should not be understood literally.

References

Citations

Sources

External links
 Four Prophets at Chabad.org

1st-millennium BC births
1st-millennium BC deaths
Book of Joel
Christian saints from the Old Testament